Beckford Priory was a medieval house of Augustinian Canons, historically within Gloucestershire, presently in Worcestershire, England. It was founded in Beckford in or shortly after 1128 as a dependency of the priory of Sainte-Barbe-en-Auge in Normandy. It was taken into the King's hand in 1414 as an alien priory and granted in 1462 to Eton College, but was re-granted by Edward IV to the collegiate church of Fotheringay. In 1547 the college was suppressed (although the church itself continued), and the site passed into lay ownership. A new house, known as Beckford Hall, was built in the 17th century on the former premises (of which only the crypt remains). The house was used in the 20th century as a Roman Catholic college.

References

Monasteries in Gloucestershire
Monasteries in Worcestershire
Augustinian monasteries in England
Alien priories in England